Öktem is a Turkish male given name and a surname. It may refer to:

 Niyazi Öktem (born 1944), Turkish academic
 Tankut Öktem (1940-2007), Turkish sculptor
 Zehra Öktem (born 1959), Turkish female archer
Kerem Öktem, Turkish contemporary historian

Given names
Turkish masculine given names
Turkish-language surnames